Nectoteuthis pourtalesi is a bathybenthic species of bobtail squid native to the tropical western Atlantic Ocean, specifically Florida and the Antilles.<ref>Reid, A. & Jereb, P. (2005). "Family Sepiolidae" in  P. Jereb & C.F.E. Roper, eds. Cephalopods of the world. An annotated and illustrated catalogue of species known to date. Volume 1. Chambered nautiluses and sepioids (Nautilidae, Sepiidae, Sepiolidae, Sepiadariidae, Idiosepiidae and Spirulidae). FAO Species Catalogue for Fishery Purposes. No. 4, Vol. 1. Rome, FAO. pp. 153–203.</ref>N. pourtalesi'' grows to a mantle length of 11 mm (given as "length to dorsal edge of mantle") and total length of 24 mm (given as "length to tip of longest sessile arm").

The type specimen was collected off Barbados and is deposited at the National Museum of Natural History in Washington, D.C.

References

External links 

 Tree of Life: Nectoteuthis

Bobtail squid
Molluscs described in 1883